The Pathein Cultural Museum is a museum in Pathein, Ayeyarwady Division in Burma.

Established in December 1990 it displays Pathein bamboo umbrellas, Buddha images, paintings, bronze drums, weapons, lacquer-wares and clay pipes, folk, arts materials, and bronze weights used in the 19th century.

Admission fees is 2 US $ and opening hour is from 10:00 am to 3:30 pm (from Tuesday to Sunday) except public holidays.

References

Museums in Myanmar
Ayeyarwady Region
Museums established in 1990